Gheorghe Leonte (born Fetești, 12 February 1963) is a former Romanian rugby union footballer. He played as a prop.

Leonte first played for Steaua Bucuresti, until he moved to France, where he represented Miélan-Mirande and CS Vienne, the last team of his player career.

He had 57 caps for Romania, scoring 4 tries, 19 points in aggregate, from 12 March 1984, in a 28-22 win over Scotland, in Bucharest, in a friendly match, to 3 June 1995, in a 42-3 defeat to Australia, in Stellenbosch, for the 1995 Rugby World Cup finals.

Leonte played in three Rugby World Cup finals, having 2 caps at the 1987 Rugby World Cup, 3 caps at the 1991 Rugby World Cup and 3 once again at the 1995 Rugby World Cup, never scoring.

Honours
Steaua Bucuresti
Divizia Nationala 1983/84, 1984/85, 1986/87, 1987/88, 1988/89, 1991/92

References

External links
Gheorghe Leonte International Statistics

1963 births
Living people
Romanian rugby union players
Rugby union props
Romania international rugby union players
People from Fetești
Romanian expatriate rugby union players
Expatriate rugby union players in France
Romanian expatriate sportspeople in France